The 2013–14 FAW Women's Cup was the 22nd season of Wales' national association football knock-out competition. It saw 25 clubs apply for entry, three less than previous season. Cardiff City Ladies were the defending champions.

Cardiff Met. Ladies F.C. won the title, after finishing runner-up three times in the last four years.

Format
Play is a straight knock-out. First two rounds are drawn on a regional basis. Seven teams receive a bye to the second round.

Results

First round
Played on 20 October 2013. Drawn into North and South groups. PILCS, Cardiff Met, Cardiff City, Wrexham, Port Talbot, Swansea City and Caernarfon Town received a bye to the second round.

|}

Second round
Played on 17 November 2013, again drawn into North and South groups.

|}

Quarter final
Played on 16 February 2014. First open draw of the Cup.

|}

Semi final
Played on 16 March 2014. PILCS lost a 2–0 lead against Cardiff Met.

|}

Final
The final is played by two former finalists. Swansea are the 2011 champions, while Cardiff Met. has lost three finals between 2010 and 2013.

References

External links
Cup at faw.org.uk

FAW Women's Cup
Women
Cup